Barry's may refer to:

 Barry's (company), an American fitness brand
 Barry's Tea, an Irish tea company
 Barry's Amusements, the largest theme park in Northern Ireland

See also
 Barry (disambiguation)